Luther J. Pollard (died 1977) was an advertising executive and businessman in the film industry in Chicago.

John W. Pollard was his father. He was a boxer and served in a "Colored" unit of the Union Army during the American Civil War. Luther's brother Frederick "Fritz" Douglass Pollard played football for Brown University, worked for the studio, went on to coach football in the NFL and established the New York Independent News newspaper.

His brother Fritz Pollard discussed their family and discrimination they faced in a 1979 interview he gave at Brown University.

The 1976 documentary film The Very Last Laugh is about the Ebony Film Corporation and Pollard's filmmaking career in Chicago. It includes footage of Pollard being interviewed. William Franklin Grisham wrote and directed the film. Pollard said he rented the studio to Oscar Micheaux to make Within Our Gates and other of his early films after Micheaux came to Chicago from Sioux City, Iowa. Pollard said he had a sister who helped Micheaux edit the book.

References

Year of birth missing
1977 deaths